is a manga by Ayumi Kano. It was licensed in English by Digital Manga Publishing and published on 23 September 2008.  In Taiwan, it is published by Sharp Point Press.

Reception
Rachel Bentham felt the love triangle was "unusual", and enjoyed the "evocative" art.  Leroy Dessaroux felt the art gave the piece a Film Noir feel, although the dialogue made it feel like a "talky teen soap opera".

References

External links
 

2006 manga
Sharp Point Press titles
Yaoi anime and manga
Tokuma Shoten manga
Digital Manga Publishing titles